Breadsall is a civil parish in the Erewash district of Derbyshire, England.  The parish contains ten listed buildings that are recorded in the National Heritage List for England.  Of these, one is listed at Grade I, the highest of the three grades, one is at Grade II*, the middle grade, and the others are at Grade II, the lowest grade.  The parish contains the village of Breadsall and the surrounding area.  The listed buildings consist of houses, cottages and associated structures, a church, and a chapel.



Key

Buildings

References

Citations

Sources

 

Lists of listed buildings in Derbyshire